Jeet Matharu is an Indian film director and assistant director who has directed many Hindi and Punjabi films. He has worked on Addi Tapaa (2004), Sikka (2015), Amaanat (1994), and Ikke Pe Ikka (1994).

Filmography
Addi Tapaa (2004)
Sikka (2015)
Amaanat (1994)
Ikke Pe Ikka (1994)

References

Punjabi-language film directors
Film directors from Mumbai